The Van Siclen Avenue station was a station on the demolished BMT Fulton Street Line in Brooklyn, New York City. It had 2 tracks and 2 side platforms. It was served by trains of the BMT Fulton Street Line. The station was built on November 18, 1889, and was the eastern terminus of the line until it was expanded to Linwood Street in February 1892, and Montauk Avenue a month later. The next stop to the east was Linwood Street. The next stop to the west was Pennsylvania Avenue. On November 28, 1948, the Independent Subway System opened the underground Van Siclen Avenue Subway station as an extension of the IND Fulton Street Line directly underneath the el station after years of war-time construction delays. This station rendered the elevated station obsolete, and it closed on April 26, 1956.

References

External links
Van Siclen Avenue Elevated Station; BMT Fulton Street Elevated (NYCSubway.org)

Defunct BMT Fulton Street Line stations
Railway stations in the United States opened in 1889
Railway stations closed in 1956
Former elevated and subway stations in Brooklyn